Transgender hormone therapy, also called hormone replacement therapy (HRT) or gender-affirming hormone therapy (GAHT), is a form of hormone therapy in which sex hormones and other hormonal medications are administered to transgender or gender nonconforming individuals for the purpose of more closely aligning their secondary sexual characteristics with their gender identity. This form of hormone therapy is given as one of two types, based on whether the goal of treatment is masculinization or feminization:
 Masculinizing hormone therapy – for transgender men or transmasculine people; consists of androgens and antiestrogens.
 Feminizing hormone therapy – for transgender women or transfeminine people; consists of estrogens and antiandrogens.

Some intersex people may also undergo hormone therapy, either starting in childhood to confirm the sex they were assigned at birth, or later in order to align their sex with their gender identity. Non-binary people may also engage in hormone therapy in order to achieve a desired balance of sex hormones or to help align their bodies with their gender identities.

Requirements
The formal requirements to begin gender-affirming hormone therapy vary widely depending on geographic location and specific institution. Gender affirming hormones can be prescribed by a wide range of medical providers including, but not limited to, primary care physicians, endocrinologists, and obstetrician-gynecologists.

Historically, many health centers required a psychiatric evaluation and/or a letter from a therapist before beginning therapy. Many centers now use an informed consent model that does not require any routine formal psychiatric evaluation but instead focuses on reducing barriers to care by ensuring a person can understand the risks, benefits, alternatives, unknowns, limitations, and risks of no treatment. Some LGBT health organizations (notably Chicago's Howard Brown Health Center and Planned Parenthood) advocate for this type of informed consent model.

The Standards of Care for the Health of Transsexual, Transgender, and Gender Nonconforming People (SOC) require that patients seeking gender-affirmation hormone therapy be evaluated for gender dysphoria by either a mental health professional or hormone provider who is qualified in the area of transgender care. The Standards also require that the patient give informed consent, in other words, that they consent to the treatment after being fully informed of the risks involved. Before beginning gender-affirming hormone therapy, the patient must be evaluated for significant medical and mental health concerns. If present, these must be addressed and reasonably well-controlled.

The World Professional Association for Transgender Health (WPATH) Standards of Care, 7th edition, note that both of these approaches to care are appropriate.

Gender dysphoria 
Many international guidelines and institutions require persistent, well-documented gender dysphoria as a pre-requisite to starting gender-affirmation therapy. Gender dysphoria refers to the psychological discomfort or distress that an individual can experience if their sex assigned at birth is incongruent with that person's gender identity. Signs of gender dysphoria can include comorbid mental health stressors such as depression, anxiety, low self-esteem, and social isolation.  It is important to note that not all gender nonconforming individuals experience gender dysphoria.

Treatment options

Guidelines
The World Professional Association for Transgender Health (WPATH) and the Endocrine Society formulated guidelines that created a foundation for health care providers to care for transgender patients. UCSF guidelines are also used. There is no generally agreed-upon set of guidelines, however.

Delaying puberty in adolescents 

Adolescents experiencing gender dysphoria may opt to undergo puberty-suppressing hormone therapy at the onset of puberty. The Standards of Care set forth by WPATH recommend individuals pursuing puberty-suppressing hormone therapy wait until at least experiencing Tanner Stage 2 pubertal development. Tanner Stage 2 is defined by the appearance of scant pubic hair, breast bud development, and/or slight testicular growth. WPATH classifies puberty-suppressing hormone therapy as a "fully reversible" intervention. Delaying puberty allows individuals more time to explore their gender identity before deciding on more permanent interventions and prevents the physical changes associated with puberty.

The preferred puberty-suppressing agent for both individuals assigned male at birth and individuals assigned female at birth is a GnRH Analogue. This approach temporarily shuts down the Hypothalamic-Pituitary-Gonadal (HPG) Axis, which is responsible for the production of hormones (estrogen, testosterone) that cause the development of secondary sexual characteristics in puberty.

Feminizing hormone therapy 

Feminizing hormone therapy is typically used by transgender women, who desire the development of feminine secondary sex characteristics. Individuals who identify as non-binary may also opt-in for feminizing hormone treatment to better align their body with their desired gender expression. Feminizing hormone therapy usually includes medication to suppress testosterone production and induce feminization. Types of medications include estrogens, antiandrogens (testosterone blockers), and progestogens. Most commonly, an estrogen is combined with an antiandrogen to suppress and block testosterone. This allows for demasculinization and promotion of feminization and breast development. Estrogens are administered in various modalities including injection, transdermal patch, and oral tablets.

The desired effects of feminizing hormone therapy focus on the development of feminine secondary sex characteristics. These desired effects include: breast tissue development, redistribution of body fat, decreased body hair, reduction of muscle mass, and more. The table below summarizes some of the effects of feminizing hormone therapy in transgender women:

Masculinizing hormone therapy 

Masculinizing hormone therapy is typically used by transgender men, who desire the development of masculine secondary sex characteristics. Masculinizing hormone therapy usually includes testosterone to produce masculinization and suppress the production of estrogen. Treatment options include oral, parenteral, subcutaneous implant, and transdermal (patches, gels). Dosing is patient-specific and is discussed with the physician. The most commonly prescribed methods are intramuscular and subcutaneous injections. This dosing can be weekly or biweekly depending on the individual patient.

Unlike feminizing hormone therapy, individuals undergoing masculinizing hormone therapy do not usually require additional hormone suppression such as estrogen suppression. Therapeutic doses of testosterone are usually sufficient to inhibit the production of estrogen to desired physiologic levels.

The desired effects of masculinizing hormone therapy focus on the development of masculine secondary sex characteristics. These desired effects include: increased muscle mass, development of facial hair, voice deepening, increase and thickening of body hair, and more.

Safety
Hormone therapy for transgender individuals has been shown in medical literature to be generally safe, when supervised by a qualified medical professional. There are potential risks with hormone treatment that will be monitored through screenings and lab tests such as blood count (hemoglobin), kidney and liver function, blood sugar, potassium, and cholesterol. Taking more medication than directed may lead to health problems such as increased risk of cancer, heart attack from thickening of the blood, blood clots, and elevated cholesterol.

Feminizing hormone therapy 
The Standards of Care published by the World Professional Association for Transgender Health (WPATH) summarize many of the risks associated with feminizing hormone therapy (outlined below). For more in-depth information on the safety profile of estrogen-based feminizing hormone therapy visit the feminizing hormone therapy page.

Masculinizing hormone therapy 
The Standards of Care published by the World Professional Association for Transgender Health (WPATH) summarize many of the risks associated with masculinizing hormone therapy (outlined below). For more in-depth information on the safety profile of testosterone-based masculinizing hormone therapy visit the masculinizing hormone therapy page.

Fertility consideration
Transgender hormone therapy may limit fertility potential. Should a transgender individual choose to undergo sex reassignment surgery, their fertility potential is lost completely. Before starting any treatment, individuals may consider fertility issues and fertility preservation. Options include semen cryopreservation, oocyte cryopreservation, and ovarian tissue cryopreservation.

A study presented at ENDO 2019 (the Endocrine Society's conference) shows that even after one year of treatment with testosterone, a transgender man can preserve his fertility potential.

Treatment eligibility
Many providers use informed consent, whereby someone seeking hormone therapy can sign a statement of informed consent and begin treatment without much gatekeeping. For other providers, eligibility is determined using major diagnostic tools such as ICD-10 or the Diagnostic and Statistical Manual of Mental Disorders (DSM). Psychiatric conditions can commonly accompany or present similar to gender incongruence and gender dysphoria. For this reason, patients are assessed using DSM-5 criteria or ICD-10 criteria in addition to screening for psychiatric disorders. The Endocrine Society requires physicians that diagnose gender dysphoria and gender incongruence to be trained in psychiatric disorders with competency in ICD-10 and DSM-5. The healthcare provider should also obtain a thorough assessment of the patient's mental health and identify potential psychosocial factors that can affect therapy.

ICD-10
The ICD-10 system requires that patients have a diagnosis of either transsexualism or gender identity disorder of childhood. The criteria for transsexualism include:
 A desire to live and be accepted as a member of the opposite sex, usually accompanied by a sense of discomfort with, or inappropriateness of, one's anatomic sex
 A wish to have surgery and hormonal treatment to make one's body as congruent as possible with one's preferred sex
Individuals cannot be diagnosed with transsexualism if their symptoms are believed to be a result of another mental disorder, or of a genetic or chromosomal abnormality.

For a child to be diagnosed with gender identity disorder of childhood under ICD-10 criteria, they must be pre-pubescent and have intense and persistent distress about being the opposite sex. The distress must be present for at least six months. The child must either:
 Have a preoccupation with stereotypical activities of the opposite sex – as shown by cross-dressing, simulating attire of the opposite sex, or an intense desire to join in the games and pastimes of the opposite sex – and reject stereotypical games and pastimes of the same sex, or
 Have persistent denial relating to their anatomy. This can be shown through a belief that they will grow up to be the opposite sex, that their genitals are disgusting or will disappear, or that it would be better not to have their genitals.

DSM
The DSM-5 states that at least two of the following criteria must be experienced for at least six months' duration for a diagnosis of gender dysphoria:
 A strong desire to be of a gender other than one's assigned gender
 A strong desire to be treated as a gender other than one's assigned gender
 A significant incongruence between one's experienced or expressed gender and one's sexual characteristics
 A strong desire for the sexual characteristics of a gender other than one's assigned gender
 A strong desire to be rid of one's sexual characteristics due to incongruence with one's experienced or expressed gender
 A strong conviction that one has the typical reactions and feelings of a gender other than one's assigned gender
In addition, the condition must be associated with clinically significant distress or impairment.

Readiness

Some organizations – but fewer than in the past – require that patients spend a certain period of time living in their desired gender role before starting hormone therapy. This period is sometimes called real-life experience (RLE). The Endocrine Society stated in 2009 that individuals should either have a documented three months of RLE or undergo psychotherapy for a period of time specified by their mental health provider, usually a minimum of three months.

Transgender and gender non-conforming  activists, such as Kate Bornstein, have asserted that RLE is psychologically harmful and is a form of "gatekeeping", effectively barring individuals from transitioning for as long as possible, if not permanently.

Accessibility
Gender-affirming care is health care that affirms people to live authentically in their genders, no matter the gender they were assigned at birth or the path their gender affirmation (or transition) takes. It allows each person to seek only the changes or medical interventions they desire to affirm their own gender identity, and hormone therapy (“HRT” or gender-affirming hormone therapy) may be a part of that.

Some transgender people choose to self-administer hormone replacement medications, often because doctors have too little experience in this area, or because no doctor is available. Others self-administer because their doctor will not prescribe hormones without a letter from a psychotherapist stating that the patient meets the diagnostic criteria and is making an informed decision to transition. Many therapists require at least three months of continuous psychotherapy and/or real-life experience before they will write such a letter. Because many individuals must pay for evaluation and care out-of-pocket, costs can be prohibitive.

Access to medication can be poor even where health care is provided free. In a patient survey conducted by the United Kingdom's National Health Service in 2008, 5% of respondents acknowledged resorting to self-medication, and 46% were dissatisfied with the amount of time it took to receive hormone therapy. The report concluded in part: "The NHS must provide a service that is easy to access so that vulnerable patients do not feel forced to turn to DIY remedies such as buying drugs online with all the risks that entails. Patients must be able to access professional help and advice so that they can make informed decisions about their care, whether they wish to take the NHS or private route without putting their health and indeed their lives in danger." Self-administration of hormone replacement medications may have untoward health effects and risks.

A number of private companies have attempted to increase accessibility for hormone replacement medications and help transgender people navigate the complexities of access to treatment.

See also

 Hormone therapy
 Sex reassignment surgery
 Real-life experience (transgender)

References

Endocrine procedures
Gender transitioning and medicine